Dr. Sarah Hunt Lockrey (1863–1929) was an American physician and suffragist.

Life
Lockrey was born on April 21, 1863 in Philadelphia, Pennsylvania. She graduated from Woman's Medical College of Pennsylvania (WMCP) in 1888.  After interning with Dr. Anna Broomall at WMCP, Lockrey went on to become chief of the gynecological staff  there.

Her career included working at the West Philadelphia Hospital for Women, the Elwyn School for the Feeble-Minded. She was a physician at Methodist Deaconess Home for more than two decades. She focused on improving women's health care, and specialized in gynecology and gynecological surgery. She was also a member of the American Medical Association (AMA), a Fellow of the American College of Surgeons, and a member of the Medical Women's National Association (MWNA).

Lockrey was a member of the National Woman's Party (NWP) where she served on the NWP's National Advisory Council. She participated in the August 6, 1918 demonstration at Lafayette Square, Washington, D.C., and was arrested and charges with "holding a meeting on public grounds" and sentenced to jail. Rather than serve her sentence, Dr. Lockrey paid a fine so that she could return to Philadelphia to perform surgery. In 1920, Lockry received the NWP's "prison pin".

Lockrey died in Philadelphia on November 8, 1929.

See also
 List of suffragists and suffragettes

References

1863 births
1926 deaths
American suffragists
Activists from Philadelphia
19th-century American women physicians
19th-century American physicians
20th-century American women physicians
20th-century American physicians
Physicians from Philadelphia
Fellows of the American College of Surgeons
Woman's Medical College of Pennsylvania alumni
Woman's Medical College of Pennsylvania faculty